The Malabar grouper (Epinephelus malabaricus) also known as blackspot rockcod, estuary rockcod, giant rock cod, greasy grouper, Malabar rockcod, Morgan's cod or speckled grouper, is a species of marine ray-finned fish, a grouper from the subfamily Epinephelinae which is part of the family Serranidae, which also includes the anthias and sea basses. It is found in the Indo-Pacific region. It has entered the Mediterranean Sea from the Red Sea by way of the Suez Canal as a Lessepsian migrant.

Distribution and habitat
The Malabar grouper is widespread throughout the tropical waters of the Indo-West Pacific area from the eastern coast of Africa to the Tonga Islands, Red Sea included. It was first recorded in the eastern Mediterranean Sea in 1969 where it remains extremely rare. Mariculture and shipping are possible vectors of introduction. This grouper lives in various habitats, such as lagoons, mangroves, coral and rocky reefs, sandy and muddy bottom areas, between 2 and 150 m deep. The juveniles prefers lagoon or brackish areas.

Description
The Malabar grouper can reach a length up to 234 cm (92 in), but average size is usually around 100 cm (39 in).  It has a light grey to light brownish background color, with a number of dark brown spots randomly scattered, which increase in number with age. The body has also a various number of brown diagonal stripes. Younger fish have a number of wide, broken vertical bands of darker shade across their bodies, but in maturity they seem to become a uniform darker colour. Young fish have numerous brown spots. The tail fin is rounded.

Biology
Epinephelus malabaricus is a protogynous hermaphrodite, as these fishes at some point in their lifespan change sex from female to male. Malabar grouper are voracious predators, they feed on fish, crustaceans, and occasionally, cephalopods.

Parasites
As most fish, the Malabar grouper harbours a variety of parasites, including the diplectanid monogeneans Pseudorhabdosynochus manifestus, P. maaensis, P. malabaricus, P. manipulus, P. marcellus, and P. maternus.

Uses
Malabar groupers are harvested for food, sport, and commercially; some are grown in aquaculture.

Gallery

References

External links

 Biolib
 Sous les Mers

Epinephelus
Fish of Thailand
Fish of the Red Sea
Fish described in 1801
Articles containing video clips